Xylaplothrips is a genus of thrips in the family Phlaeothripidae.

Species
 Xylaplothrips ananthakrishnani
 Xylaplothrips bamboosae
 Xylaplothrips bogoriensis
 Xylaplothrips caliginosus
 Xylaplothrips clavipes
 Xylaplothrips darci
 Xylaplothrips debilis
 Xylaplothrips dubius
 Xylaplothrips emineus
 Xylaplothrips flavitibia
 Xylaplothrips flavus
 Xylaplothrips fuliginosus
 Xylaplothrips fungicola
 Xylaplothrips inquilinus
 Xylaplothrips ligs
 Xylaplothrips micans
 Xylaplothrips mimus
 Xylaplothrips montanus
 Xylaplothrips pictipes
 Xylaplothrips pusillus
 Xylaplothrips reedi
 Xylaplothrips subterraneus
 Xylaplothrips tener
 Xylaplothrips togashii
 Xylaplothrips trinervoidis
 Xylaplothrips ulmi
 Xylaplothrips zawirskae

References

Phlaeothripidae
Thrips
Thrips genera
Insects described in 1928
Taxa named by Hermann Priesner